Agave × arizonica is a rare plant, endemic to Arizona.  It is a hybrid between two species of Agave in the family Asparagaceae, A. chrysantha and A. toumeyana var. bella.  It was discovered in the 1960s near a summit of the New River Mountains, near the Maricopa-Yavapai county line north of Phoenix, Arizona.

Agave × arizonica is a small plant about 30 cm high and 40 cm broad. Although similar to Agave utahensis, it has distinct differences in suckering more sparingly, in not forming a large dense clump, having leaves with a distinct dark brown margin and also more cylindrical flowers. Its flowers are yellow, with 10-20 per cluster, each up to 3.5 cm (1.4 in) long.

References

arizonica
Flora of Arizona
Interspecific plant hybrids
Plants described in 1970